The Yungas tree frog (Boana balzani) is a species of frog in the family Hylidae found in Bolivia and Peru. Its natural habitats are subtropical or tropical moist lowland forests, subtropical or tropical moist montane forests, rivers, and canals and ditches.

References 

Yungas tree frog
Amphibians of Bolivia
Amphibians of Peru
Amphibians described in 1898
Taxonomy articles created by Polbot